The Rasa is a left tributary of the river Argeș in Romania. It discharges into the Argeș in Șoldanu.

References

Rivers of Romania
Rivers of Călărași County